Oud-Heverlee is a municipality located in the Belgian province of Flemish Brabant. The municipality comprises the villages of Blanden, Haasrode, Oud-Heverlee proper, Sint-Joris-Weert and Vaalbeek. On January 1, 2018, Oud-Heverlee had a total population of 11,099. The total area is 31.14 km2 which gives a population density of 356 inhabitants per km2.

Football team
The football team of Oud-Heverlee (Oud-Heverlee Leuven) plays in the first division in Belgium since the 2011–12 season. They won the second division title in 2011. They have their training ground here.

See also
 Haasrode Research-Park

References

External links
 

 
Municipalities of Flemish Brabant